Daniel de Burgh Kinahan (born 14 April 1958) is an Ulster Unionist Party (UUP) politician, who was the  Member of Parliament (MP) for South Antrim from 2015 to 2017. 
Prior to his election as a Member of Parliament, Kinahan was a Member of the Northern Ireland Assembly  (MLA) for South Antrim, from 2009 to 2015.

In August 2020, he was appointed Northern Ireland's first Veterans Commissioner.

Early life and personal life
He is the son of Sir Robin Kinahan and Coralie de Burgh and was educated at Craigflower Preparatory School (Torryburn), Stowe School and the University of Edinburgh. He is a cousin of singer Chris de Burgh. Professionally Kinahan is an antiques expert and worked as Christie's auctioneers Irish representative.

He lived for many years with his wife and four children at Castle Upton, Templepatrick but in 2016 announced he was selling the family home to downsize following the moving out of his children.

Northern Ireland Assembly

In 2005 he was elected to Antrim Borough Council, and on 28 May 2009 the UUP South Antrim branch selected Kinahan to replace the outgoing MLA David Burnside who resigned to pursue business interests. Burnside officially stood down on 1 June. Kinahan was sworn in on 9 June.

Kinahan faced his first NI Assembly election in May 2011 and was elected with 3,445 first preference votes. During his second period in Stormont, he was heavily involved in education legislation as the UUP's spokesperson on the policy area.

As Deputy Chair of the Education Committee, Kinahan became a leading figure during the passage of the Education Bill. He also opposed the Sinn Féin policy of scrapping grammar schools, arguing instead for academic capability streaming.

Kinahan also expressed strong support in favour of shared and integrated education, greater emphasis on STEM subjects, a wider selection of apprenticeships, stronger provision of careers advice and more thorough and engaging university degrees.

Kinahan was the only UUP MLA to support legalising same-sex marriage, making a speech on the issue at Stormont, which many deemed risky just weeks out from the Westminster election, which he eventually won.

He stepped down from the NI Assembly after his election to Westminster and was replaced by Adrian Cochrane-Watson.

Westminster MP
The UUP decided to run Kinahan in the 2015 general election, and he ousted the incumbent Democratic Unionist Party (DUP)  MP William McCrea with a majority of 949. However, Kinahan lost his seat in the 2017 election following a resurgence of the DUP, with Paul Girvan winning by 3,208 votes.

During the 2019 snap election, Kinahan stood again in South Antrim for the Ulster Unionist Party, but was unsuccessful in getting elected.

References

|-

1958 births
Living people
Alumni of the University of Edinburgh
Blues and Royals officers
Graduates of the Royal Military Academy Sandhurst
High Sheriffs of Antrim
Members of Antrim Borough Council
Members of the Parliament of the United Kingdom for County Antrim constituencies (since 1922)
Northern Ireland MLAs 2007–2011
Northern Ireland MLAs 2011–2016
People educated at Craigflower Preparatory School
People educated at Stowe School
People from County Antrim
UK MPs 2015–2017
Ulster Unionist Party members of the House of Commons of the United Kingdom
Ulster Unionist Party MLAs